Comford is a small settlement in Cornwall, England, United Kingdom. It is approximately 3 miles (5 km) southeast of Redruth on the A393 road and very close to Gwennap.

References

Hamlets in Cornwall